Speed Dependent Damping Control (also called SD²C) was an automatic damper system installed on late-1980s and early-1990s Cadillac automobiles.  This system firmed up the suspension at 25 mph (40 km/h) and again at 60 mph (97 km/h).  The firmest setting was also used when starting from a standstill until 5 mph (8 km/h).

Applications:
 1989–1992 Cadillac Allanté

Computer Command Ride

The semi-active suspension system was updated as Computer Command Ride in 1991.  This new system included acceleration, braking rates, and lateral acceleration to the existing vehicle speed metric.

 1991– Cadillac Fleetwood
 1991– Cadillac Eldorado
 1991– Cadillac Seville
 1991– Cadillac De Ville (optional, standard for 1993)
 1992– Oldsmobile Achieva SCX W41

References
 
 

Automotive suspension technologies
Automotive technology tradenames
Vehicle safety technologies
Auto parts
Mechanical power control
Shock absorbers
Cadillac